Sergio Ceccotti (born 1935 in Rome) is an Italian painter. He lives and works in Rome.

Biography 

He first studied at the Internationale Sommerakademie für Bildende Kunst in Salzburg under the direction of Oskar Kokoschka and attended then the drawing courses of the French Academy in Rome from 1956 to 1961.

In the 1950s and early 1960s, Sergio Ceccotti's work shows influence of cubism, of Giorgio de Chirico to whom he was compared, and, above all, of the German Expressionism. He felt very close to the Masters of the New Objectivity and engaged an intellectual correspondence with some of them, like Otto Dix, Conrad Felixmüller and Ludwig Meidner.

At the beginning of the 1960s, the influence of film noir movies and comic strips turn his painting into a more narrative style. The use of the code of film noir makes the real uncertain and the reading of comic enables him to add numerous objects in the minimum space to get more intensity. From that date, his paintings were regularly shown in Italian and French galleries as well as museums in Europe.

His etchings were published in limited edition books of French and Italian poets like Jacques Baron, Georges-Emmanuel Clancier, Jean-Pierre Biondi and Giorgio Vigolo. He has also illustrated books and made front covers for the surrealist writer Philippe Soupault who wrote a text on his painting in 1980, "L'Insolite quotidien".  The portrait that Sergio Ceccotti made of the writer was shown in the exhibition, "Philippe Soupault, le surréalisme et quelques amis" at the Musée du Montparnasse in 2007.

Sergio Ceccotti's painting reflects paradoxes and fears of contemporary metropolis with his global visions of based on heterogeneous elements: fotonovela, Alfred Hitchcock films, mass media, roman noir and contemporary novels, art history and breaking news. His art reveals a metaphysical, sociological and almost mysterious vision of daily life.

In 2014, the Villa Torlonia (Rome) museum devoted a retrospective exhibition to him, showing more than eighty paintings from 1958 to 2014 in the pavilion of the Casino dei Principi. In 2018, the Palazzo delle Esposizioni celebrates the sixty years of activity of the painter by hosting the exhibition “Sergio Ceccotti. Il romanzo della pittura 1958-2018” curated by Cesare Biasini Selvaggi.

Solo exhibitions (selection) 
 1977: galerie Liliane François, Paris
 1979: galerie Liliane François, Paris
 1985: galerie Jan de Maere, Bruxelles
 1987: Galleria Comunale d'Arte Contemporanea, Arezzo
 1988: galerie Jan de Maere & Ozenne, Paris
 1990: galerie Alain Blondel, Paris
 1992: galerie Alain Blondel, Paris
 1993: Upplands Konstmuseum, Uppsala 
 2000: La Musique du temps, galerie Alain Blondel, Paris
 2003: Cloître des Cordeliers, Tarascon
 2004: Galleria d'Arte Moderna e Contemporanea, Anticoli Corrado
 2006: Roman parisien, galerie Alain Blondel, Paris
 2009: Soupçon, galerie Alain Blondel, Paris. Galeria Tondinelli, Rome
 2010: Las Colores de la vida, Centro Cultural Borges, Buenos Aires
 2013: Histoires sans histoire, galerie Alain Blondel, Paris
 2014: La vita enigmistica, Musei di Villa Torlonia – Casino dei Principe, Rome.  Capolinea 19 La Stellina Arte Contemporanea, Rome. Lumières. Dolci malinconie, Galleria Elle Arte, Palerme
 2018: Sergio Ceccotti. Il romanzo della pittura 1958-2018, Palazzo delle Esposizioni, Rome

Collective exhibitions (selection) 
 1971–1975: Salon de la jeune peinture, Paris
 1974: Le Mythe de la Société Moderne vue à travers la machine, galerie la Passerelle Saint-Louis, Paris
 1979: Ville Matrice, Ville Matricule, galerie Pierre Lescot, Paris
 1983: Tel peintre, Quels maîtres ?, galerie ABCD, Paris
 1985: L’Italie d’aujourd’hui – Italia oggi, CNAC Villa Arson, Nice
 1988: Signes, schémas, images, Acropolis, Nice. Reality, Artemis gallery, Bruxelles
 1989: Regards sur la Révolution française, galerie Liliane François, Paris
 1990: Collection Liliane François, Centre d’arts plastiques, Royan
 1997: Philippe Soupault, l’inconnu, l’amour, la poésie, Bibliothèque Nationale, Paris
 2003: Futuro Italiano, Parlement Européen, Bruxelles. Geografie del mistero. Metafisica, dada, surrealismo, Il Narciso, galleria d´arte contemporanea, Rome. Cuore Selvaggio, galleria Annovi, Sassuolo
 2005: Pittori figurativi italiani nella seconda metà del XX secolo, Fondo Mole Vanvitelliana, Ancona
 2006: Sinfonia urbana – Echi dalla città, Il Narciso, galleria d´arte contemporanea, Rome
 2007: Philippe Soupault, le surréalisme et quelques amis, Musée de Montparnasse, Paris
 2008: Love, Palazzo Ducale, Genoa
 2011: Ah, che rebus – Cinque secoli di enigma fra arte e gioco in Italia, Istituto Nazionale per la Grafica, Rome
 2012: 54. Biennale di Venezia, Padiglione Italia, Regione Lazio, Museo Nazionale del Palazzo di Venezia, Rome
 2016: Still life – Style of life, Jean-Marie Oger, Paris

Public and private collections (selection) 
Vatican Museums, Modern Religious Art collection; Galleria d’Arte Moderna, Bologna; Galleria Comunale d’Arte Contemporanea, Arezzo; Pinacoteca “C. Barbella”, Chieti; Civica Pinacoteca, San Gimignano; Galleria Civica d’Arte Moderna, Santhià; Museo del Pattinaggio, Finale Emilia; Bibliothèque Nationale, Paris; Bibliothèque Littéraire Jacques Doucet, Paris; Staatliches Museum Lindenau, Altenburg; Museo Renato Guttuso, Bagheria; Banca d’Italia, Rome; Banca Nazionale del Lavoro, Rome; La Compagnie Financière Edmond de Rothschild, Paris; Bulgari, Rome; Provincia Regionale di Palermo; Università degli studi di Palermo, polo museale.

See also

Bibliography 
 Sergio Ceccotti – L’Insolite quotidien, preface by Philippe Soupault, Valori Plastici, Rome, 1980.
 Sergio Ceccotti: opere recenti, texts by Maurizio Fagiolo dell'Arco, Galleria il Narciso, Rome, 1983. 
 Sergio Ceccotti, text by Patrick Roegiers, Éditions Galerie Jan de Maere, Brussels, 1987.  
 Ceccotti, Editions Ramsay, Coll. Vision, Paris, 1992.
 Sergio Ceccotti, texts by Edward Lucie-Smith, Edition Lachenal-Ritter, Paris, 2001. 
 Sergio Ceccotti – Catalogo generale dell'opera grafica, texts by Cesare Biasini Selvaggi and Stefano Liberati, Unione Europea Esperti d'Arte, 2002.
 Sergio Ceccotti, texts by Cesare Biasini Selvaggi, Carlo Cambi editore, 2014. 
 Sergio Ceccotti - Il romanzo della pittura 1958 >2018, texts by Cesare Biasini Selvaggi, Carlo Cambi editore, 2018.

External links 
 Official site
 Jean-Marie Oger

References 

20th-century Italian painters
21st-century Italian painters
Italian male painters
1935 births
Living people
Contemporary painters
Modern painters
Italian contemporary artists
20th-century Italian male artists
21st-century Italian male artists